Chionodes latro is a moth in the family Gelechiidae. It is found in North America, where it has been recorded from Florida.

The larvae feed on Selaginella arenicola.

References

Chionodes
Moths described in 1999
Moths of North America